Victor Larco Herrera (1870 in Trujillo, Peru – May 10, 1939 in   Santiago de Chile) was a prominent politician, farmer and philanthropist from Peru. He devoted much of his life to social and cultural affairs. Since 1945, the Victor Larco Herrera District was named after the trujillan philanthropist who with their property supported the first residents of the district. Larco Herrera was also mayor of Trujillo.

Biography
He was elected senator for the La Libertad Region in 1904, and then successively re-elected until 1919. In 1913, he was elected mayor of Trujillo, to the city gave the building now occupied the Municipality of Trujillo.
 
At the time of the coup that ousted then-President Guillermo Billinghurst on February 4, 1914, joined representatives who advocated for the right of succession that  constitution recognizes as first vice president, and for this he had to suffer a brief incarceration. Then Larco Herrera had agricultural operations to Argentina between 1916 and 1917, encouraged by the favorable situation created by the First World War.

See also
Victor Larco Herrera district
Larco Avenue
Trujillo

References

People from Trujillo, Peru
Mayors of Trujillo, Peru
1870 births
1939 deaths
Members of the Senate of Peru